The Convention Center–Southwest Waterfront Line, designated as Route 74, is a daily bus route that is operated by the Washington Metropolitan Area Transit Authority between Walter E. Washington Convention Center (K & 6th Streets NW) and Buzzard Point (2nd & R Streets SW) via 7th Street NW/SW. The line operates every 30 minutes at all times. Trips are roughly 20–30 minutes. This line provides service via Downtown connecting major arenas, the National Mall, and landmarks without having to enter by train. It is a replacement for Metrobus Routes 70 and 71 and the DC Circulator's Convention Center-Southwest Waterfront route.

Route description and service
Route 74 operates between Walter E. Washington Convention Center and Buzzard Point connecting the National Mall and Downtown DC via 7th Street NW/SW.

Route 74 operates out of Shepherd Parkway division on weekdays; during late nights and all day on weekends, Route 74 operates out of Bladensburg division.

Route 74 stops

History

Route 74 originally operated between Soldiers Home in Northwest and Fort McNair but was discontinued between the 1970s to 1980s and replaced by routes 70 and 71.

Buzzard Point service was primarily served by route 71 which operated from Silver Spring station along Georgia Avenue while route 70 operated up to Half & O Streets SW (Nationals Park). Other routes running into Buzzard Point were routes P1, P2, V7, V8, V9, and the DC Circulator Convention Center–SW Waterfront line.

During WMATA's Fiscal Year of 2011, WMATA proposed to end route 70 and 71 service at Archives station eliminating service past Constitution Avenue in order to improve efficiency and overlap to local service. WMATA proposed to reroute the P6 along M Street SW via Delaware Avenue, Canal Street, P Street, and 4th Street back to M Street to replace Route 70 and via Delaware Avenue, Canal Street, 2nd Street, V Street, Half Street, S Street, 1st Street, P Street, and 4th Street back to M Street to replace Route 71.

Later proposals have a new route 74 which will operate between Walter E. Washington Convention Center to Buzzard Point which will discontinue route 71 and shorten route 70 to Archives station. This route will operate along 7th Street NW serving the National Mall, Capital One Arena, Chinatown, Southwest Waterfront, and Fort McNair which is similar to its prior incarnation routing.

New Route 74
On September 25, 2011, a new route 74 was introduced running between the Walter E. Washington Convention Center to Buzzard Point replacing the DC Circulator Convention Center-Southwest Waterfront route, replacing Route 70 past Archives station and replaced route 71 entirely. The new service will run every 18 minutes during the peak hours and 24 minutes at all other times.

Changes
On June 17, 2012, the Buzzard Point loop was discontinued due to low ridership. However, the frequency of buses was improved from 18 to 20 minutes to 12–15 minutes during the weekday peak hours in order to reduce crowding.

Later in September 2013, WMATA announced a series of proposals to route 74.

A proposal was to discontinue all route 74 service and replace it with routes V7, and V8 which will be implemented in June 2014. The reason for the 74 discontinuing was low ridership on routes in Southwest and would provide a better balance of capacity and demand for routes V7, and V8. The proposal according to WMATA goes as the following: 
 74 – Discontinue all service
 V7, V8 – Reroute from M Street SW via Delaware Avenue SW, Canal Street SW, P Street SW, 4th Street SW, M Street SW, and 6th Street SW
 V7, V8 – Extend to the Convention Center (K & 6th Streets NW) via 7th Street NW
 V7, V8 – Discontinue between Minnesota Ave station and Deanwood station and between L’Enfant Plaza and Bureau of Engraving

Service will be discontinued along O Street SW, Half Street SW, and P Street SW east of Canal Street where route 74 ran. Another option for route 74 was to decrease the frequency to every 16–20 minutes weekdays and run between 6 AM to 10 PM daily. However, none of the changes were made due to customer feedback.

During the years, WMATA proposed to re-extend route 74 back to Buzzard Point in order to serve the new Audi Field in its FY2018, and the 2019 Metrobus State of Good Operations proposal.

On the FY2018 proposal, WMATA announced the following:
 Stadium Extension Option: Extend from the Half & O Streets SW terminal to the new DC United stadium (Audi Field) at 2nd & R Streets SW. Service would be extended along Half Street, P Street, 2nd Street, V Street, 1st Street, T Street, and 2nd Street to P Street SW.
 Wharf Option: Reroute to serve the new southwest Wharf development along 7th Street and Maine Avenue SW between I and 6th Streets SW.
 4th & P Streets SW Option: Reroute service to operate in both directions along 4th Street and P Street SW between M and Canal Streets SW. From M Street & Maine Avenue (or 6th Street) SW, service would be rerouted along M Street, 4th Street, P Street, and Canal Street to O Street SW.

This will eliminate service on the following:
 Stadium Extension Option: P Street between Half Street and 2nd Street SW. One stop at P & 1st Streets would no longer have service. The stop at P & Canal streets SW would be replaced with a stop on 2nd Street, south of P Street SW. 
 Wharf Option: 6th and I Streets SW. The northbound and southbound bus stops at 6th & K Streets SW would no longer have service. Route V1 will provide alternative service on parts of the former route while most stops are walking distance to the 74.
 4th & P Streets SW Option: M Street and Delaware Avenue between 4th Street and Canal Street SW. One stop on M Street and two stops on Delaware Avenue would no longer be served. New stops would be established on southbound 4th Street and eastbound P Street SW, generally opposite existing north and eastbound stops on these streets. Route P6 will provide alternative service on parts of the former route while most stops are walking distance to the 74.

For the 2019 proposed changes, route 74 will be extended along the Stadium Extension Option similar to the FY2018 budget but with a reduced span. Service prior to 6-7 AM and after 10-11 PM will be discontinued with alternative service provided by route P6.

According to WMATA, the reasons for changes it goes as the following:
 Provide service to the new Buzzard Point development and Audi Field which was proposed earlier in the FY2018 budget.
 Service frequencies adjusted to maintain the same number of buses over a longer route and keep the service proposal cost neutral. The proposed extension to Buzzard Point adds approximately one mile and eight minutes per round trip.
 The proposed shortening of service hours has been requested by the District Department of Transportation. The following number of current early morning and late evening passengers would be affected by the change in service hours:

Route 74 was running slow and got an F on the Metro Report Card according to Greater Greater Washington. Ward 6 Councilmember Charles Allen said in a phone interview with Greater Greater Washington:

The changes that they [WMATA] are proposing—to extend the line in a way that the 74 bus can go further down Buzzard Point and connect to Audi Field—that’s not the problem. I think that it’s a good thing to help connect Audi Field by bus. But the way in which they’re proposing to accomplish that, to go to a stadium, is by reducing service for the residents that are the most dependent on that bus line.

The 74 is just an example of how WMATA is treating bus service overall. WMATA needs to add more buses and by doing so, they keep the headways at a more manageable time frame.

Gail Fast, Ward 6D ANC Commissioner and chairperson in a phone interview with Greater Greater Washington said that getting to Audi Field is good for the District, but the way in which WMATA is executing the proposal comes at the cost of residents who will have longer wait times to use a bus that is already infrequent stating:

If you’re going to be a 21st-century city and you want to get people away from cars, you have to provide modal transport that moves people fast. So who’s going to travel by bus? It becomes a lost route. It really isn’t the best use of that bus line.

According to WMATA Public Relations Manager Sherri Ly, she stated:

Staff is currently reviewing the public input and expects to present recommendations on the proposed bus service changes to the Board of Directors next month. All feedback provided during the public comment period is provided to the Board for consideration prior to making their decision. Any service changes, including when those changes would take effect, will be determined by the Board.

During the COVID-19 pandemic, the line was reduced to operate on its Saturday supplemental schedule during the weekdays beginning on March 16, 2020. On March 18, 2020, the line was further reduced to operate on its Sunday schedule. On March 21, 2020, weekend service was suspended.

On August 23, 2020, all route 74 service was extended back to Buzzard Point via its 2012 routing/former route 71 routing serving Audi Field. Service was also cut only operating every 30 minutes between 6:30 am to 10:30 pm daily.

In February 2021 during the FY2022 budget, WMATA proposed to eliminate the route if they do not get any federal funding.

References

2011 establishments in Washington, D.C.
74